Alok Sharma may refer to:

 Alok Sharma (born 1967), British politician
 Alok Sharma (cricketer) (born 1991), Indian cricketer
 Alok Sharma (neuroscientist) (born 1961), Indian neuroscientist